Derambila lumenaria is a moth of the family Geometridae described by Carl Geyer in 1837. It is found in Sri Lanka, India and Sundaland.

Prominent black dots are found along the wing margins.

References

Moths of Asia
Moths described in 1837